Qubalıbalaoğlan (also, Qubalıbaloğlan, Kubah, Kubali-Bala-Oglan, Kubaly, and Kubalybalaoglan) is a village and municipality in the Hajigabul Rayon of Azerbaijan.  It has a population of 2,631.  The municipality consists of the villages of Qubalıbalaoğlan and Pirsaatçay.

References 

Populated places in Hajigabul District